{{Speciesbox 
| image = Apistops caloundra.jpg
| image_caption = 
| display_parents = 3
| parent_authority = J. D. Ogilby, 1911
| taxon = Apistops caloundra
| authority = (De Vis, 1886)
| synonyms = * Apistus caloundra De Vis, 1886
| synonyms_ref = 
}}Apistops is a monotypic genus of wasp scorpionfishes belonging to the subfamily Apistinae in the family Scorpaenidae, the scorpionfishes and their relatives. Its only species is the short-armed waspfish (Apistops caloundra), also known as the shortfinned waspfish or shortspine waspfish. This species is found in the Indian and Pacific waters from Papua New Guinea, the Arafura Sea and northwest Australia. This species grows to a length of  SL.Apistops was first described as a genus in 1911 by the Australian ichthyologist James Douglas Ogilby for Apistus caloundra, a species which had been described in 1886 by the English zoologist Charles Walter De Vis who gave the type locality as Caloundra in Queensland. The genus name Apistops means "lookong like Apistus'', the genus it was originally placed in by De Vis and the specific name refers to the type locality.

References

Apistinae
Monotypic ray-finned fish genera
Fish described in 1886